Kapidan Marka Gjoni (1861–1925) was the chieftain of the Mirdita region and tribe in North Albania. He was born in Orosh. He was made Kaymakam of Mirdita by the Ottoman Empire during the absence of Prenk Bib Doda, who was interned in Anatolia due to his participation in the Albanian League of Prizren.

With the death of Prenk Bib Doda, who had no male heirs, the Gjonmarkaj lineage passed to Marka Gjoni. Marka Gjoni's initial attempt to claim the title Kapedan was fraught with difficulties because many of the leaders of Mirdita refused to recognise him, but in time he earned their respect. In 1889, alongside Mons. Doci of Orosh, and at the request of some Catholics in Shkodra, Kapedan Marka Gjoni convinced the Monsignor to conduct the first mass at the church of Our Lady of Shkodra in Bachallek, which had remained closed since Shkodra fell in the hands of the Turks in 1479. Thus on April 26, 1889, exactly 410 years later, Mons. Doci administered the first Holy Mass. It was a very important and historical event and to this day a Mass is held on April 26 at the church in honor of Our Lady of Shkodra.

In 1896, Marka Gjoni's younger brother Ded Gjoni was killed by Turkish soldiers on his way to Orosh. This event began a downward spiral for the house. The following year, Marka Gjoni was summoned to Shkodra by the Governor under false pretenses. There he was caught and put on a ferry to Istanbul. From there, he was exiled for five years in Mosul, Iraq. After the five years, with help of some nuns, Marka Gjoni was able to escape his exile dressed as a pilgrim, wearing a beard and pulling a donkey, which was bought for that purpose. He infiltrated a caravan of Bedouins and set off to Mecca, pretending to be a pilgrim. A few weeks later, he headed to the Russian border, where he convinced the guards that he was not a Bedouin but a Catholic Albanian who had escaped from exile in Mosul. From there, he went to Odessa and boarded a Russian ferry to the port of Bulgaria. He ultimately made his way back to Orosh where he was welcomed with open arms by the tribes, glad that their Kapedan had returned.

In 1921, with financial support from Belgrade, Marka Gjoni rebelled against the Albanian government and proclaimed Mirdita as independent. The so-called Republic of Mirdita was supported by Serbia and Greece, but was swiftly put down by the Albanian government on 20 November 1921. Marka Gjoni was forced to flee to Yugoslavia, thought he later returned to Albania and was active in Mirdita until his death.

He and his wife Dava had four daughters and one son, Gjon Markagjoni, a well-known opponent of Communist forces during World War II.

References

1861 births
1925 deaths
Albanians from the Ottoman Empire
19th-century Albanian people
20th-century Albanian people
Albanian Roman Catholics
People from Mirditë
19th-century Albanian military personnel
20th-century Albanian military personnel